This is a list of presidents of the Democratic Republic of the Congo (formerly the Republic of the Congo and Zaire) since the country's independence in 1960.

The current President is Félix Tshisekedi, since 24 January 2019.

Presidents of the Democratic Republic of the Congo (1960–present)

(Dates in italics indicate de facto continuation of office)

Timeline

Rank by time in office

See also

 Politics of the Democratic Republic of the Congo
 President of the Democratic Republic of the Congo
 Prime Minister of the Democratic Republic of the Congo
 List of prime ministers of the Democratic Republic of the Congo
 List of colonial governors of the Congo Free State and Belgian Congo

Notes

References

External links
Official website of the President of the DRC
World Statesmen – Congo (Kinshasa)

Democratic Republic of the Congo
Democratic Republic of the Congo presidents
Presidents
Presidents
Presidents